Pauline Tully (formerly Pauline Tully-McAuley) is an Irish Sinn Féin politician who has been a Teachta Dála (TD) for the Cavan–Monaghan constituency since the 2020 general election. She was a member of Cavan County Council for the Ballyjamesduff local electoral area from the 1999 election until 2012.

Early and personal life
Tully grew up on a farm in Kilnaleck, County Cavan, where she still lives. She teaches history at Breifne College. 

In 2003 Tully married IRA member Pearse McAuley; at the time he was imprisoned for the killing of Jerry McCabe, and granted day release for the wedding. Her name was Pauline Tully-McAuley on the 2004 and 2009 election ballot papers. Her husband was released from prison in August 2009, and she resigned as councillor in 2012 due to the demands of her teaching job and childcare. She and McAuley separated in February 2014 and on Christmas Eve 2014 he stabbed her 13 times in front of their two children, for which he was imprisoned until June 2022.

References

External links
Sinn Féin profile

Year of birth missing (living people)
Living people
Local councillors in County Cavan
Members of the 33rd Dáil
21st-century women Teachtaí Dála
Politicians from County Cavan
Sinn Féin TDs (post-1923)